Sacred Heart Church is a historic church at 343 South Broad Street in Trenton, Mercer County, New Jersey, United States.

It was built in 1889 and added to the National Register of Historic Places on May 2, 2002. The church was dedicated on June 30, 1889.

References

External links
Church of the Sacred Heart official website

Roman Catholic Diocese of Trenton
Churches in Trenton, New Jersey
Churches on the National Register of Historic Places in New Jersey
Neoclassical architecture in New Jersey
19th-century Roman Catholic church buildings in the United States
Roman Catholic churches completed in 1889
National Register of Historic Places in Trenton, New Jersey
New Jersey Register of Historic Places
Neoclassical church buildings in the United States